Algibacter is a genus in the phylum Bacteroidota (Bacteria).

Etymology
The name Algibacter derives from:Latin feminine gender noun alga, seaweed; New Latin masculine gender noun, a rodbacter, nominally meaning "a rod", but in effect meaning a bacterium, rod; New Latin masculine gender noun Algibacter, rod isolated from seaweed.

Species
The genus contains 15 species (including basonyms and synonyms), namely
 A. aestuarii
 A. agarilyticus
 A. agarivorans
 A. alginicilyticus
 A. amylolyticus
 A. aquimarinus
 A. lectus (Nedashkovskaya et al. 2004, (Type species of the genus).; Latin masculine gender adjective lectus, chosen, selected, referring to a bacterium that forms select, beautiful colonies.)
 A. marinivivus
 A. mikhailovii (Nedashkovskaya et al. 2007, ; New Latin masculine gender genitive case noun mikhailovii, of Mikhailov, in honour of Valery V. Mikhailov, a Russian microbiologist, for his contributions to the development of marine microbiology.)
 A. miyuki
 A. onchidii
 A. pacificus
 A. pectinivorans
 A. psychrophilus
 A. undariae

See also
 Bacterial taxonomy
 Microbiology

References 

Flavobacteria
Bacteria genera